Shizuko Hoshi is a Japanese-American actress, theater director, dancer and choreographer. Born in Japan, she is a graduate of Tokyo Women's College and University of Southern California. She was married to actor Mako, the founding artistic director of East West Players in Los Angeles, and worked closely with the Asian-American theatre company from 1965 to 1989.

Career
Shizuko Hoshi arrived in the United States in 1957 and enrolled at the University of Southern California. Hoshi won the US Open women's singles titles in table tennis in 1958 and 1959. She stopped tournament play following her marriage to Mako.

While at East West Players, Hoshi received many awards for performance, directing and choreography, including a Los Angeles Drama Critics Circle Award for Featured Performance in Wakako Yamauchi's And the Soul Shall Dance, as well as Drama-Logue Awards for Best Director for Hokusai Sketchbooks, Asa ga Kimashita, A Chorus Line and Mishima.  Her film credits include Memoirs of a Geisha, Come See the Paradise and M. Butterfly.

She appeared in the indie film, Charlotte Sometimes and narrated the Academy Award-winning Live Action Short Film, Visas and Virtue. She has also appeared on television, in such shows as Chicago Hope and M*A*S*H*. In 1995, Hoshi co-directed the English language premiere of the Japanese comedy The Fall Guy off-Broadway in New York City.

Personal life
Hoshi was married to Mako until his death in 2006. They have two daughters (both of whom are actresses) and two grandchildren.

Filmography

Television

References

External links
 

Year of birth missing (living people)
Living people
American female table tennis players
American sportspeople of Japanese descent
American theatre directors of Japanese descent
American actresses of Japanese descent
American film actresses
American stage actresses
American television actresses
American film actors of Asian descent
University of Southern California alumni
Japanese emigrants to the United States
20th-century American actresses
21st-century American actresses
American dancers of Asian descent